Hotel Dusk: Room 215 is a point-and-click adventure game for the Nintendo DS. Originally titled as Wish Room, the game made its first public appearance on May 9, 2006, at that year's E3 convention. It was originally released in North America on January 22, 2007, before being released subsequently in other regions. The game supports the Nintendo DS Rumble Pak accessory. The game was later republished in 2008 as part of the Touch! Generations line of DS games. The game was developed by the now-defunct Cing. A sequel, Last Window: The Secret of Cape West, was released in 2010 for the DS.

Gameplay

The player, as Kyle Hyde, moves around and interacts with the environment using the DS's touch screen and must solve a variety of puzzles using the handheld's various features including the touch screen, microphone, and closeable cover. The DS is held rotated 90 degrees from normal, like a book, with an option in the game to allow the player to switch which side the touchpad is on depending on which hand is dominant.

Throughout the game, the player must speak with the various hotel patrons and employees in order to uncover vital information, and at the end of most chapters, must interrogate a major character in a manner somewhat similar to a boss fight. The player can show the characters items that Kyle has collected, or ask questions that have been brought to Kyle's attention. By asking the right questions, Kyle will uncover the information he needs. If he asks the wrong question, makes a wrong assumption, behaves rudely, shows the wrong item, gets caught with something that isn't his, or encounters someone (usually an employee) in a restricted area or room (either by noticing him or getting their attention), he may confuse, frighten or anger the person, usually indicated by a darkening of the character in question.  This can also prematurely end Kyle's mission in failure, usually by the hotel manager expelling him from the premises or a crucial character ceasing to cooperate with him, preventing him from ever solving the mystery.  

The game is filled with adventure-style puzzles, most of which involve using the touch screen to perform a simple task. Movement is made by leading an iconic representation of Kyle around a map of the hotel on the touch screen or d-pad while a first-person three-dimensional view is shown on the other screen.

There is also a journal to write in, which is used by several other characters as well, though all critical in-game story notes are copied automatically.  It gives three pages to write in, with a simple pencil/eraser system.

Synopsis
The game takes place at Hotel Dusk, a fictional, rundown motel outside of Los Angeles, in 1979. Kyle Hyde, a former N.Y.P.D. detective now working as a salesman for a company called Red Crown, arrives at the hotel in search of his former partner, Brian Bradley, and is given Room 215, a room rumored to be able to grant wishes. Hyde soon finds that the hotel has many mysteries as well as connections to his past, and begins to look into these further. The order of the discovery of these elements within the game will depend on choices players make, and as such, the summary below is the chronological order of the larger story.

Robert Evans and Dunning Smith were friends at college, but went their separate ways. Evans inherited his family's art gallery, while Dunning wanted to become a professional painter. Both married and each had a daughter: Mila and Jenny, respectively. In 1960, they reunited in an airport, after both of their wives died in a tragic plane crash. A year later, Evans came up with the idea of creating "Osterzone", a dead painter from the 19th century whose works would be highly valued. Evans deeply admired Dunning's skill at painting, and offered him to paint works to be credited as Osterzone's, to which he agreed. While Dunning painted, Evans displayed the works in his art gallery and created the mythos of Osterzone. The scam was successful; the paintings sold for fortunes, including one called "Angel Opening a Door", and Evans and Dunning became rich.

Their activities attracted the attention of a crime syndicate, called "Nile," that Evans worked with. Evans bought Hotel Dusk in 1969 to use as a front for his illicit meetings and to provide a secret workshop for Dunning to paint, despite Dunning's wishes to get out of the scam. During one meeting with Nile, Dunning refused to continue painting, prompting Nile agents to kidnap Jenny. During the skirmish, Mila, who was playing with Jenny, was knocked into a coma. Evans forced Dunning to continue to paint as Osterzone in order to see Jenny again. Evans, now in trouble with Nile, was forced to sell his art gallery, and gave Hotel Dusk to Dunning before keeping himself secluded. Dunning lost hope of seeing Jenny again after three years and quit painting, but Evans, now having severed ties with Nile, convinced him to wait at the hotel and Jenny would be returned in time, implying that he intends to rescue her. Dunning became the hotel's owner and renovated it to hide the evidence of Nile and Osterzone, while creating the mythos of Room 215 so as to attract customers.

Three years prior to the game's present, Hyde and Bradley investigated a series of art thefts by Nile in New York City, and Bradley was assigned as an undercover cop in the case. Evans informed Bradley that Nile was holding his sister -also named Mila- hostage to force him to disclose confidential information on the investigation. During the time he was working as an informant for Nile, Bradley learned of Dunning and Osterzone, and later stole "Angel Opening a Door" from Nile in anticipation of returning it to Dunning. However, despite giving Nile the information they sought, Bradley's sister Mila was murdered by Evans. Hyde received word about Bradley being on the take. Blinded by rage at his partner's betrayal, Hyde confronted Bradley at the Hudson River and shot him. Bradley survived the wound, but fell into the river and disappeared; unbeknownst to Hyde, he continued to pursue Evans in order to avenge his sister's death. Hyde, feeling remorse over his actions, quit the force and took up the salesman job to search for Bradley.

Six months before the start of the game, Bradley checked into Hotel Dusk under Hyde's name and spoke to Dunning about what he knew of Nile and Osterzone. Despite Dunning's distrust, Bradley turned over "Angel Opening a Door" to him, and while staying at the hotel, left several clues for Hyde to find and uncover the truth, including a goodbye letter asking Hyde to give up searching for him because he was now on the run from both Nile and the police. Bradley then left the hotel and visited Evans' daughter Mila, who bore a resemblance to his sister in addition to having the same first name. Seeing his own sister in Mila, Bradley gave her the bracelet that belonged to his sister. Shortly after this visit, Mila woke from her coma unable to speak. It is implied that around this time, Bradley succeeded in hunting down and killing Evans, since the latter's visits to the comatose Mila suddenly ceased. After waiting several months for Evans to appear, Mila decided to leave the hospital, following the only clue she had: a pamphlet to Hotel Dusk that Bradley left behind.

At the start of the game, Mila and Hyde arrive at the hotel around the same time. Hyde is able to piece together all the clues to the hotel's past, including the identity of Dunning and Mila. After helping to reconcile the two, Hyde leaves the hotel to continue his search for Bradley. Depending on actions taken during the game, Mila asks to come with Hyde and he accepts, and the two leave in his car.

In a secret post-credits scene, a now-adult Jenny is seen arriving at the hotel on New Year's Eve.

Development
Production took about a year and a half with 20 staff members involved. In an interview with QJ.net, Director Taisuke Kanasaki explained that they wanted Hotel Dusk to have "an unprecedented visual expression not found in any other game".

The game uses rotoscoping to animate its characters while a brushwork style illustrates the game's environments with half-finished backgrounds with 3-D objects strewn about. While not a first in gaming, rotoscoping is still rare in most games (with only a handful, namely the original Prince of Persia using the animation style).

Reception
{{Video game reviews
|MC = 78/100
|AdvGamers = 
|Edge = 6/10
|EGM = 8.67/10
|EuroG = 7/10
|Fam = 33/40
|GI = 7/10
|GamePro = 3.75/5
|GameRev = B−
|GSpot = 8.2/10
|GSpy = <ref>{{cite web |author=Eduardo Vasconcellos |date=January 26, 2007 |title=GameSpy: Hotel Dusk: Room 215 |url=http://ds.gamespy.com/nintendo-ds/hotel-dusk-215/759159p1.html |publisher=GameSpy |archive-url=https://web.archive.org/web/20070202031343/http://ds.gamespy.com/nintendo-ds/hotel-dusk-215/759159p1.html |archive-date=February 2, 2007 |url-status=dead |access-date=July 7, 2016}}</ref>
|GT = 8.1/10
|GameZone = 8.9/10
|IGN = 7.9/10
|NP = 8/10
|rev1 = The A.V. Club|rev1Score = D+
|rev2 = The Sydney Morning Herald|rev2Score = 
}}Hotel Dusk: Room 215 received "generally favorable reviews" according to the review aggregation website Metacritic. In Japan, Famitsu gave it a score of one nine, one seven, one nine, and one eight for a total of 33 out of 40.

The game was also selected as one of Gaming Target's "52 Games We'll Still Be Playing From 2007". It was the 76th best-selling game in Japan in 2007, with 213,208 copies sold. A retrospective at Kotaku described the experience as "a big puzzle; everyone has a secret, and the writing (and localization) is done so well, I was constantly surprised by the characters and their motivations".

The reception was not universally positive, though. The New York Times gave it an average review and called it "unrelentingly linear". 411Mania gave it a score of seven out of ten, saying that the game is "easy to like and easier to want to get more of." The Sydney Morning Herald gave it three stars out of five, and said: "Having to wait until the game lets you solve a riddle even though you have grasped the solution long ago is particularly galling. Players too often feel like passengers on a scripted ride, rather than individual auteurs directing their own unique experience". The A.V. Club gave it a D+ and pointed out that "while a mystery should keep you alert for clues and misstatements, Hotel Dusk slaps you in the forehead with every new piece of evidence, then patronizes you with reading-comprehension quizzes after every chapter".

In 2011, Adventure Gamers named Hotel Dusk the 65th-best adventure game ever released.

Sequel
A sequel, Last Window: The Secret of Cape West, was released in 2010 in Japan and Europe. It takes place in Los Angeles, California during 1980, a year after the events of Hotel Dusk. Due to developer Cing's bankruptcy, Last Window was not released in North America.

See alsoChase: Unsolved Cases Investigation Division – Distant Memories''

References

External links

Wish Room: Tenshi no Kioku official Japanese site

2007 video games
Cing games
Detective video games
Neo-noir video games
Nintendo games
Nintendo DS games
Nintendo DS-only games
Point-and-click adventure games
Touch! Generations
Video games developed in Japan
Video games set in 1960
Video games set in 1961
Video games set in 1969
Video games set in 1976
Video games set in 1979
Video games set in hotels
Video games set in Los Angeles
Video games set in Nevada
Video games with rotoscoped graphics
Visual novels